The Hindus cricket team was an Indian first-class cricket team which took part in the annual Bombay tournament.  The team was founded by members of the Hindu community in Bombay.

The Hindus joined the Bombay tournament in 1906, when they challenged the Europeans cricket team and the Parsees cricket team and the competition was renamed the Bombay Triangular. The Hindus continued to participate in the tournament until it was discontinued after the 1945-46 season. They won 11 times.

Among the noted Hindus players was Palwankar Baloo, who is regarded as India's first great spin bowler.

External links
Hindus cricket team at CricketArchive

Sources
Vasant Raiji, India's Hambledon Men, Tyeby Press, 1986
Mihir Bose, A History of Indian Cricket, Andre-Deutsch, 1990
Ramachandra Guha, A Corner of a Foreign Field - An Indian History of a British Sport, Picador, 2001

Indian first-class cricket teams
Former senior cricket clubs of India